Duplex weintraubi is a moth of the family Erebidae first described by Michael Fibiger in 2010. It is known from eastern Timor.

The wingspan is about 8 mm. The forewing is grey in the basal, subterminal and terminal areas, including the fringes. The medial area is dark brown. All crosslines are present and beige, jagged or waved. The terminal line is marked by dense black interneural spots. The hindwing is light grey, without a discal spot and the underside of the forewing is dark grey, while the underside of the hindwing is grey, with an indistinct discal spot.

References

Micronoctuini
Taxa named by Michael Fibiger
Moths described in 2010